The NHS Pension Scheme is a pension scheme for people who work for the English NHS and NHS Wales. It is administered by the NHS Business Services Authority, a special health authority of the Department of Health of the United Kingdom. The NHS Pension Scheme was created in 1948.

The NHS Pension Scheme is made up of the 1995/2008 Scheme and the 2015 Scheme. From 1 April 2015 all new joiners, without previous scheme membership, join the 2015 Scheme automatically. Members prior to 1 April 2015 retain rights to remain in the 1995 or 2008 section of the existing scheme for an age-dependent limited time, after which they must transition to the 2015 scheme unless they reach the normal retirement age of their old scheme first.

The NHS Pension Scheme has 1.7 million members actively contributing, 713,000 deferred members and 1 million pensioners receiving benefits.

The benefits and conditions vary according to the type of worker and the dates of their service. From 2008 the "Normal Retirement Age" changed from 60 years to 65 years while the cost of membership was increased. From 2015 the scheme retirement age was aligned with the State retirement age (65 - 68). The benefits are index-linked and guaranteed.  They are based on final salary and years of membership of the scheme (members who joined before 1 April 2015) or career average salary (members who joined after 1 April 2015). There is an employer charge of 0.08% for administration costs, in addition to employer contributions at a rate of 20.6% of salary from April 2019.

As of 2016, the tiered employee contribution rates start at a 5% rate, increasing in 7 steps to 14.5% on income above £111,337. Members can increase their contributions if they wish to get larger benefits (within certain limits).

See also
Scottish Public Pensions Agency, which administers the pension scheme for NHS Scotland
Agenda for Change, the grading and pay system for NHS staff, excepting doctors, dentists, apprentices and some senior managers

References

External links
Official website
NHS Employers website

National Health Service (England)
NHS Wales
Public pension funds in the United Kingdom